The Squadrone Volante ("Flying Squad") was a 17th-century group of independent and liberal cardinals within the College of Cardinals of the Roman Catholic Church. It attempted to influence the outcome of a number of papal conclaves.

History

The papal conclave of 1644 to elect Pope Urban VIII's successor had been a matter of divided loyalties. Many of the cardinals created by Pope Urban VIII had formed a faction loyal to the Kingdom of France, controlled by Urban's Cardinal-Nephew, Antonio Barberini. Others had formed a faction loyal to the Kingdom of Spain. French envoy Cardinal Mazarin had not arrived in time to exercise France's jus exclusivae and Innocent, an ally of Spain, was elected.

At the death of Pope Innocent X, the College of Cardinals came together for the papal conclave of 1655. While Pope Urban's Barberini nephews and supporters still pushed for Giulio Cesare Sacchetti to be elected, Innocent had created a large number of cardinals; some with loyalties to Spain, others with no loyalty to any particular monarchy. Many of these cardinals refused to support the Barberini. Making matters worse, Urban's reign (only 11 years earlier) had been famous for its rampant nepotism, much of which had benefited those same nephews. Innocent's reign had been little better and so cardinals were inclined to elect a pope who would bring repute back to the papacy.

At the same time, Innocent's third and final Cardinal-Nephew, Camillo Astalli, had fallen into disrepute. Though he remained a Cardinal and would participate in the conclave, he did not control the College in the same way as the Barberini had tried to control the previous conclave.

And so the conclave of 1655 began with the Spanish still opposed to Sacchetti, the French still opposed to anyone nominated by those loyal to Spain and no-one to control the cardinals. As a result, the cardinals entered the conclave with an unprecedented level of independence.

A group of cardinals, led by Cardinal Decio Azzolino, began to further the view within the College that it was time for a pope who would lead the Catholic Church away from the nepotism which had caused the Church considerable suffering over the preceding decades. Azzolino was also the representative of the very-much-in-fashion Christina, Queen of Sweden. The group called themselves the Flying Squad; Squadrone Volante.

Conclave of 1655

The conclave of 1655 was straightforward enough – the cardinals wanted an end to nepotism and the Squadrone could provide exactly that. Cardinal Pietro Ottoboni (later elected Pope Alexander VIII) is said to have exclaimed, "this time we must seek an honest man!". Azzolino gave his reply; "If you want an honest man, there stands one" and pointed to Cardinal Fabio Chigi.

With no better a suggestion to be found, the College elected Chigi who took the papal throne as Pope Alexander VII.

Conclave of 1667

Still protected by Christina of Sweden and led by her now-favourite Azzolino, the Squadrone continued to operate during Pope Alexander's reign and remained highly involved in European politics in the second half of the 17th century.

In 1667, Alexander died and the College of Cardinals again convened for the papal conclave of 1667.

By then, the Squadrone had developed a good working relationship with those cardinals who remained loyal to the French. While still independent, the Squadrone engineered the nomination by the French of Giulio Rospigliosi who was acceptable to the leader of the Spanish faction, Cardinal Ernst von Harrach.

Rospigliosi was elected and took the throne as Pope Clement IX.

Adding further credence to the alleged involvement of the Squadrone, Rospigliosi, who was Cardinal Secretary of State, resigned the post and appointed Cardinal Azzolino as his replacement on the very night he was elected.

See also
Roman Curia
Saint Gallen Group

References

Further reading 
Journal of the Swedish embassy in the years 1653 - 1654.

>
+
History of the Roman Curia
17th century in Rome